The 2011–12 North West Counties Football League season was the 30th in the history of the North West Counties Football League, a football competition in England. Teams were divided into two divisions: the Premier Division and Division One.

Premier Division 

The Premier Division featured three new teams:

 A.F.C. Blackpool promoted as champions of Division One
 Runcorn Town promoted as runners up of Division One
 A.F.C. Liverpool promoted from First Division to fill a vacancy

League table

Results

Locations

Division One 

Division One featured three new teams:

 Formby demoted from the Premier Division due to infringement of rules
 Nelson promoted as a reformed team
 Northwich Villa promoted through application after finishing 9th in the Cheshire Football League Division One

League table

Results

Locations

References

 http://www.nwcfl.com/index.php?page=league-tables

External links 
 NWCFL Official Site
 2010–11 League Rules

North West Counties Football League seasons
9